This is a list of the tallest buildings in the Balkans. This list includes buildings in the Balkans with a height of 74m or at least 20 floors, including Slovenia and the European part of Turkey.

The highest building in the Balkans is Skyland İstanbul 1, located in the European side of Istanbul, Turkey (293m), with the tallest building in Turkey located on the Asian side of Istanbul with Metropol Istanbul Tower (301m). The tallest building in Bosnia and Herzegovina is Avaz Twist Tower (142m). The tallest building in Albania is Downtown One (150m), in Bulgaria Rousse TV Tower (204m), in Croatia is Dalmatia Tower (115m), in Romania is Floreasca City Center (137m), in Serbia is Belgrade Tower (168m), in Slovenia is Crystal Palace (89m), in Kosovo is Prishtina City Center (125m), in North Macedonia is Cevahir Towers (130m) and the tallest building in Greece is Athens Tower 1 (103m).

Tallest buildings
This list ranks buildings in the Balkans that stand at least 70 m (230 ft) or 20 floors, based on standard height measurement.

Tallest buildings under construction or proposed
This list ranks buildings that are under construction in the Balkans and are planned to rise at least 70 m (230 ft) or 20 floors. Buildings that are approved, on-hold or proposed are included in this table.

Gallery

See also
List of tallest buildings in Albania
List of tallest buildings in Bosnia and Herzegovina
List of tallest buildings in Bulgaria
List of tallest buildings in Croatia
List of tallest buildings and structures in Greece
List of tallest buildings in Kosovo
List of tallest buildings in North Macedonia
List of tallest buildings in Romania
List of tallest structures in Serbia
List of tallest buildings in Slovenia
List of tallest buildings in Turkey
List of tallest buildings in Europe
List of tallest buildings and structures in the world

Notes

References

Balkans
Balkans